LAHT May refer to 
 High-strength low-alloy steel (LAHT)
 Laht, an Estonian surname.
 Latin American Herald Tribune, an online newspaper in Venezuela.